This is a list of German television related events from 1967.

Events

Debuts

Domestic
15 September - Graf Yoster (1967–1977) (ARD)

Television shows

1950s
Tagesschau (1952–present)

1960s
 heute (1963-present)

Ending this year

Births
22 January - Jenny Jürgens, singer, actress & TV host

Deaths